Sørlie or Sorlie may refer to:

Arthur G. Sorlie (1874–1928), the fourteenth Governor of North Dakota, USA
Else-Marthe Sørlie Lybekk (born 1978), Norwegian team handball player, world champion and Olympic gold medallist
Reidar Sørlie (1909–1969), Norwegian discus thrower
Robert Sørlie (born 1958), two time Iditarod champion Norwegian dog musher and dog sled racer from Hurdal

See also
Sorlie Memorial Bridge, connects the cities of Grand Forks, North Dakota and East Grand Forks, Minnesota

Norwegian-language surnames

de:Sorlie